The Challenge Cup records are statistics for a knockout rugby football league cup competition. The Challenge Cup rugby tournament is organised by the Rugby Football League.

Final Records

Team

 Most wins: 19 by Wigan
 Most finals: 30 by Wigan
 Highest winning score: Leeds Rhinos 52 v London Broncos 16 in 1999.
 Lowest winning score: Broughton Rangers 4 v Wigan 0 in 1911
 Widest margin: Leeds Rhinos 50 v Hull Kingston Rovers 0 in 2015
 Most points aggregate: 72 by St. Helens 40 v Bradford Bulls 32 in 1996
 Least points aggregate: 4 by Broughton Rangers 4 v Wigan 0 in 1911
 Most tries by one team: 9, by Huddersfield v St. Helens in 1915, Leeds Rhinos v London Broncos in 1999, and Leeds Rhinos v Hull Kingston Rovers in 2015
 Consecutive wins and finals: 8 by Wigan from 1988 to 1995
 Consecutive final defeats: 3 by Hull (1908–10) and Leeds (2010-2012)
 Most tries aggregate: 13 by St. Helens (8) v Bradford Bulls (5) in 1996
 Biggest attendance: 102,569 Warrington v. Halifax (replay) at Odsal Stadium, Bradford in 1954

Individual

 Most appearances: 11 by Shaun Edwards (Wigan – 1984, 85, 88, 89, 90, 91, 92, 93, 94, 95; London Broncos – 1999)
 Most wins: 9 by Shaun Edwards – (Wigan – 1985, 88, 89, 90, 91, 92, 93, 94, 95)
 Most goals: 8, by Cyril Kellett (Featherstone Rovers v Bradford Northern in 1973), and Iestyn Harris (Leeds Rhinos v London Broncos in 1999)
 Most tries: 5 by Tom Briscoe (Leeds Rhinos v Hull KR in 2015)
 Most points: 20, (2 tries, 7 goals) by Neil Fox (Wakefield Trinity v Hull in 1960), 20, (1 try, 8 goals) by Iestyn Harris (Leeds Rhinos v London Broncos in 1999) and 20, (5 tries) by Tom Briscoe (Leeds Rhinos v Hull KR in 2015)
 Most goals in all finals: 23 by Kevin Sinfield, (Leeds, 2003 - 4, 2005 - 4, 2010 - 1, 2011 - 1, 2012 - 3, 2014 - 3, 2015 - 7)
 Most tries in all finals: 6 by Kevin Iro (Wigan, 1988 – 2, 1989 – 2, 1990 – 2), 6 by Tom Briscoe (Leeds, 2014 - 1, 2015 - 5)
 Most points in all finals: 46 by Frano Botica (Wigan, 1991 – 8pts, 1992 – 10pts, 1993 – 8pts, 1994 – 10pts, 1995 – 10 pts) and Kevin Sinfield, (Leeds, 2003 - 8pts, 2005 - 8pts, 2010 - 2pts, 2011 - 2pts, 2012 - 6pts, 2014 - 6pts, 2015 - 14pts)

Round Records

Team
 Highest score: York City Knights 132 v Northumbria University 0 2011
 Longest unbeaten run: 43 by Wigan (42 victories and 1 draw)

Individual
 Most goals in a match: 22 by Jim Sullivan (Wigan v. Flimby and Fothergill) in 1925
 Most tries in a match: 11 by George West (Hull Kingston Rovers v. Brookland Rovers in 1905)
 Most points in a match: 56 (4 tries, 20 goals) by Chris Thorman (York City Knights v. Northumbria University in 2011)

See also

 Rugby league in the British Isles
 Rugby league in England
 Rugby league in Ireland
 Rugby league in Scotland
 Rugby league in Wales
 Rugby League International Federation
 Rugby League European Federation

References

External links

Challenge Cup
Rugby league records and statistics